Phalangiotarbi (Haase, 1890) is an extinct arachnid order first recorded from the Early Devonian of Germany and most widespread in the Upper Carboniferous coal measures of Europe and North America. The last species are known from the early Permian Rotliegend of Germany.

The affinities of phalangiotarbids are obscure, with most authors favouring affinities with Opiliones (harvestmen) and/or Acari (mites and ticks). Phalangiotarbida has been recently (2004) proposed to be sister group to (Palpigradi+Tetrapulmonata): the taxon Megoperculata sensu Shultz (1990).

Nemastomoides depressus, described as a harvestman in the family Nemastomoididae, is actually a poorly preserved phalangiotarbid.

Names
The order is also called Phalangiotarbida, the ending -ida originated when Petrunkevitch (1955) tried to standardize the endings of the arachnid orders, which is unnecessary and unwarranted according to the ICZN. Nevertheless, Phalangiotarbida has become the more widespread usage in the recent literature.

Architarbi Petrunkevitch, 1945 is a synonym.

Taxa included

 Family Anthracotarbidae Kjellesvig-Waering, 1969
 Genus Anthracotarbus Kjellesvig-Waering, 1969
 Species Anthracotarbus hintoni Kjellesvig-Waering, 1969
 Family Architarbidae Karsch, 1882
 Genus Architarbus Scudder, 1868
 Species Architarbus hoffmanni Guthörl, 1934  (Jr synonyms Opiliotarbus kliveri Waterlot, 1934; Goniotarbus sarana Guthörl, 1965) 
 Species Architarbus minor Petrunkevitch, 1913
 Species Architarbus rotundatus Scudder, 1868
  Genus Bornatarbus Rößler & Schneider, 1997
 Species Bornatarbus mayasii Haupt in Nindel, 1955
 Genus Devonotarbus Poschmann, Anderson & Dunlop, 2005 
 Species Devonotarbus hombachensis Poschmann, Anderson & Dunlop, 2005
 Genus Discotarbus Petrunkevitch, 1913
 Species Discotarbus deplanatus Petrunkevitch, 1913
 Genus Geratarbus Scudder, 1890
 Species Geratarbus lacoei Scudder, 1890  
 Species Geratarbus bohemicus Petrunkevitch, 1953
 Genus Goniotarbus  Petrunkevitch, 1953
 Species Goniotarbus angulatus Pocock, 1911
 Species Goniotarbus tuberculatus Pocock, 1911
 Genus Hadrachne Melander, 1903
 Species Hadrachne horribilis Melander, 1903
 Genus Leptotarbus Petrunkevitch, 1945
 Species Leptotarbus torpedo Pocock, 1911
 Genus Mesotarbus Petrunkevitch, 1949
 Species Mesotarbus angustus Pocock, 1911
 Species Mesotarbus eggintoni Pocock, 1911
 Species Mesotarbus hindi Pocock, 1911  
 Species Mesotarbus intermedius Petrunkevitch, 1949
 Species Mesotarbus peteri Dunlop & Horrocks, 1997
 Genus Metatarbus Petrunkevitch, 1913
 Species Metatarbus triangularus Petrunkevitch, 1913
 Genus Ootarbus Petrunkevitch, 1945
 Species Ootarbus pulcher Petrunkevitch, 1945
 Species Ootarbus ovatus Petrunkevitch, 1945
 Genus OrthotarbusPetrunkevitch, 1945
 Species Orthotarbus minutus Petrunkevitch, 1913
 Species Orthotarbus robustus Petrunkevitch, 1945
 Species Orthotarbus nyranensis Petrunkevitch, 1953
 Genus Paratarbus Petrunkevitch, 1945
 Species Paratarbus carbonarius Petrunkevitch, 1945
 Genus Phalangiotarbus Haase, 1890
 Species Phalangiotarbus subovalis Woodward, 1872
 Genus Pycnotarbus Darber, 1990
 Species Pycnotarbus verrucosus Darber, 1990
 Genus Triangulotarbus Patrick, 1989    
 Species Triangulotarbus terrehautensis Patrick, 1989    
 Family Heterotarbidae Petrunkevitch, 1913
 Genus Heterotarbus Petrunkevitch, 1913
 Species Heterotarbus ovatus  Petrunkevitch, 1913
 Family Opiliotarbidae Petrunkevitch, 1949
 Genus Opiliotarbus Pocock, 1910
 Species Opiliotarbus elongatus Scudder, 1890
 nomina dubia
 Eotarbus litoralis  Kušta, 1888
 Nemastomoides depressus Petrunkevitch, 1913

References

Bibliography 
 Petrunkevitch, Alexander I. (1955): Arachnida. pp. 42–162 in Treatise on Invertebrate Palaeontology, part P. Arthropoda 2 (R.C. Moore, ed.). Geological Society of America & University of Kansas Press, Lawrence.
 Shultz, Jeffrey W.(1990): Evolutionary morphology and phylogeny of Arachnida. Cladistics 6: 1-38.
 Dunlop, Jason A. (1997): Palaeozoic arachnids and their significance for arachnid phylogeny. Proceedings of the 16th European Colloquium of Arachnology 65–82. - Abstract
 Pollitt, Jessica R.; Braddy, Simon J. & Dunlop, Jason A. (2004): The phylogenetic position of the extinct arachnid order Phalangiotarbida Haase, 1890, with reference to the fauna from the Writhlington Geological Nature Reserve (Somerset, UK). Transactions of the Royal Society of Edinburgh, Earth Sciences, 94(3): 243–259.  - PDF available on request 
 Pinto-da-Rocha, R., Machado, G. & Giribet, G. (eds.) (2007): Harvestmen - The Biology of Opiliones. Harvard University Press 

Further reading
  (1997): Phalangiotarbid arachnids from the Coal Measures of Lancashire, UK. Geological Magazine'' 134: 369–381. 

Arachnid orders
Paleozoic arachnids
Prehistoric arthropod orders
Taxa named by Erich Haase